Dor Kochav (born 6 May 1993) is an Israeli footballer who plays as a midfielder. He currently plays for Sketzia Ness Ziona.

Career
Dor Kochav played for the youth academy of Maccabi Haifa. On 8 February 2012 he made his debut for the senior team after coming up a substitute in the 79th minute in the Israeli Cup.

References

Profile page in Maccabi Haifa website

1993 births
Living people
Israeli footballers
Footballers from Northern District (Israel)
People from Ramat Yishay
Maccabi Haifa F.C. players
Hapoel Afula F.C. players
Hapoel Petah Tikva F.C. players
Hapoel Acre F.C. players
Ironi Nesher F.C. players
Hapoel Nir Ramat HaSharon F.C. players
Bnei Yehuda Tel Aviv F.C. players
Sektzia Ness Ziona F.C. players
Israeli Premier League players
Liga Leumit players
Association football midfielders